Sir Benjamin Heywood, 1st Baronet  (12 December 1793 – 11 August 1865) was an English banker and philanthropist.

Early life
Benjamin Heywood was born on 12 December 1793 in St Ann's Square, Manchester. He was the grandson of Thomas Percival, the son of Nathaniel Heywood and Ann Percival, the brother to Thomas Heywood and James Heywood, and the nephew to Samuel Heywood. He lived at "Claremont" to the north west of the city centre in Irlams o' th' Height. He graduated from the University of Glasgow.

Career
Heywood entered his father's bank becoming a partner in 1814 and sole proprietor in 1828. He was an enthusiast for workers' education and was a founder of the Manchester Mechanics' Institute, serving as its president from 1825 until 1840. Heywood briefly served as Member of Parliament for Lancashire from 1831 until 1832, receiving his baronetcy in recognition of his work in support of the 1832 Reform Bill. He was also active in the Manchester Statistical Society.

Personal life
The family had a strong affinity with the south Derbyshire and Staffordshire area and bought a summer retreat at Dove Leys, near Denstone (When the Claremont area (Irlams o' th' Height) of Pendleton, Salford, was built up, many of the streets were given names such as Duffield Road, Doveleys Road, Denstone Road, among others.)

He was the father of:
Sir Thomas Percival Heywood, 2nd Baronet;
Oliver Heywood; and
Rev. R.H. Heywood.

Honours
Baronet, (1838)
Fellow of the Royal Society, (1843)

See also
Heywood's Bank

References

Bibliography

McConnell, A. (2004) "Heywood, Sir Benjamin, first baronet (1793–1865)", Oxford Dictionary of National Biography, Oxford University Press, Retrieved 10 Aug 2007 (subscription required)

English bankers
English philanthropists
Heywood, Benjamin, 1st Baronet
Whig (British political party) MPs for English constituencies
Members of the Parliament of the United Kingdom for Lancashire
Fellows of the Royal Society
Politicians from Manchester
UK MPs 1831–1832
1793 births
1865 deaths
Benjamin
19th-century British philanthropists
Manchester Literary and Philosophical Society
19th-century English businesspeople